Clive Owen (born 3 October 1964) is an English actor. He first gained recognition in the United Kingdom for playing the lead role in the ITV series Chancer from 1990 to 1991. He received critical acclaim for his work in the film Close My Eyes (1991) before earning international attention for his performance as a struggling writer in Croupier (1998). In 2005, he won a Golden Globe and a BAFTA Award and was nominated for an Academy Award for his performance in the drama Closer (2004).

Owen has played leading roles in films such as Sin City (2005), Derailed (2005), Inside Man (2006), Children of Men (2006), and The International (2009). In 2012, he earned his first Primetime Emmy Award nomination for Outstanding Lead Actor in a Miniseries or a Movie for his role in Hemingway & Gellhorn. He played Dr. John W. Thackery on the Cinemax medical drama series The Knick, for which he received a Golden Globe Award for Best Actor – Television Series Drama nomination. In 2021, he starred in a psychological romance horror miniseries Lisey's Story and also portrayed President Bill Clinton in the third season of American Crime Story.

Early life
Clive Owen was born on 3 October 1964 in Keresley, Coventry (then in Warwickshire), the fourth of five sons born to Pamela ( Cotton) and Jess Owen. His father, a country and western singer, left the family when Owen was three years old, and despite a brief reconciliation when Owen was 19, the two have remained estranged. He has described his childhood as "rough". 

While initially opposed to drama school, he changed his mind in 1984, after a long and fruitless period of searching for work. Owen graduated from the Royal Academy of Dramatic Art. After graduation, he worked at the Young Vic, performing in several Shakespearean plays.

Career

Early career
Initially, Owen's career was in television. In 1988, he starred as Gideon Sarn in a BBC production of Precious Bane and the Channel 4 film Vroom before the 1990s saw him become a regular on stage and television in the UK, notably his lead role in the ITV series Chancer, followed by an appearance in the Thames Television production of Lorna Doone.

He won critical acclaim for his performances in the Stephen Poliakoff film Close My Eyes (1991) about a brother and sister who embark on an incestuous love affair. He subsequently appeared in The Magician, Class of '61, Century, Nobody's Children, An Evening with Gary Lineker, Doomsday Gun, Return of the Native and a Carlton production called Sharman, about a private detective. In 1996, he appeared in his first major Hollywood film The Rich Man's Wife alongside Halle Berry before finding international acclaim in a Channel 4 film directed by Mike Hodges called Croupier (1998). In Croupier, he played the title role of a struggling writer who takes a job in a London casino as inspiration for his work, only to get caught up in a robbery scheme. In 1999, he appeared as an accident-prone driver in Split Second, his first BBC production in about a decade.

Owen starred in The Echo, a BBC1 drama, before starring in the film Greenfingers, about a criminal who goes to work in a garden. He appeared in the BBC1 mystery series Second Sight. In 2001, he provided the voice-over for Walk On By, a BBC2 documentary about popular music, as well as starring in a highly acclaimed theatre revival of Peter Nichols' play A Day in the Death of Joe Egg, about a couple with a severely handicapped daughter.

Subsequent work

Owen became known to North American audiences in the summer of 2001 after starring as "The Driver" in The Hire, a series of short films sponsored by BMW and made by prominent directors. He appeared in Robert Altman's Gosford Park. He appeared in the 2002 film The Bourne Identity. In 2003, he reteamed with director Mike Hodges in I'll Sleep When I'm Dead. He starred in Beyond Borders as well as King Arthur in King Arthur, for which he learned to ride a horse.

He appeared in the Royal National Theatre debut of the hit play Closer, by Patrick Marber, which was produced as a film in 2004. He played Dan in the play, and played Larry in the film version. His portrayal of Larry in the film received very favourable reviews, as well as the Golden Globe and BAFTA awards, and an Academy Award nomination for Best Supporting Actor. He noted that the expectations of him since the Oscar nomination have not changed the way he approaches film-making, stating "I try, every film I do, to be as good as I can and that's all I can do."

After Closer, he appeared in Derailed alongside Jennifer Aniston, the comic book thriller Sin City as the noir antihero Dwight McCarthy and as a mysterious bank robber in Inside Man. Despite public denials, Owen had been rumoured to be a possible successor to Pierce Brosnan in the role of James Bond. A public opinion poll in the United Kingdom in October 2005 by SkyNews found that he was the public's number one choice to star in the next instalment of the series. In that same month, however, it was announced that fellow British actor Daniel Craig would become the next James Bond. In an interview in the September 2007 issue of Details, he claimed that he was not offered or approached concerning the role. 

In 2006, Owen spoofed the Bond connection by making an appearance in the remake of The Pink Panther in which he plays a character named "Nigel Boswell, Agent 006" (when he introduces himself to Inspector Clouseau, he quips that Owen's character is "one short of the big time").

In 2006, Owen starred in Children of Men. The film was nominated for various awards, including an Academy Award for Best Adapted Screenplay; Owen worked on the screenplay, although he was uncredited. The next year he starred alongside Paul Giamatti in the film Shoot 'Em Up and appeared as Sir Walter Raleigh opposite Cate Blanchett's Elizabeth I of England in the film Elizabeth: The Golden Age. He appeared in the Christmas special of the Ricky Gervais and Stephen Merchant show Extras. 

Owen starred in The International (2009), a film which he described as a "paranoid political thriller".  He played the lead in The Boys Are Back, an Australian adaptation of the book The Boys Are Back in Town by Simon Carr.

In June 2010 it was announced that Owen and Nicole Kidman would star in an HBO film about Ernest Hemingway and his relationship with Martha Gellhorn entitled Hemingway & Gellhorn. James Gandolfini served as executive producer to the film, written by Barbara Turner and Jerry Stahl. The film was directed by Philip Kaufman and released in 2012. Owen played the lead in Shadow Dancer, a joint UK/Ireland production about a young mother who is involved with Irish republicanism. It co-starred Andrea Riseborough, Gillian Anderson, and Aidan Gillen, and was directed by James Marsh. In April 2010, he was cast as the lead in Juan Carlos Fresnadillo's horror-thriller Intruders.

Owen starred in the film Blood Ties, directed by Guillaume Canet, alongside French actress Marion Cotillard. It was released in June 2013 at the 2013 Cannes Film Festival. In 2015, Owen made his Broadway debut in a revival of Harold Pinter's Old Times at the American Airlines Theatre. He was selected to be on the jury for the main competition section of the 2016 Berlin Film Festival.

In October 2017, Owen returned to Broadway as Rene Gallimard in a revival of David Henry Hwang's M. Butterfly at the Cort Theatre in New York City.

In 2019, Owen played the role of the defrocked Reverend T. Lawrence Shannon in the West End theatre production of Tennessee Williams' The Night of the Iguana at the Noël Coward Theatre. Also in 2019, he played Dovidl Rapaport in The Song of Names. He is playing Bill Clinton in the miniseries Impeachment: American Crime Story.

Personal life
Owen met his wife, Sarah-Jane Fenton, in 1988, when they were both taking part in a production of Shakespeare's Romeo and Juliet  at the Young Vic Theatre in London. They began dating shortly after and married in March 1995. The couple have two daughters together.

Owen became patron of the Electric Palace Cinema in Harwich, Essex, and launched an appeal for funds to repair deteriorating elements of the historic building.

Owen is a supporter of Liverpool FC and narrated the fly on the wall documentary series Being: Liverpool.

Filmography

Film

Television

Stage

Video games

Producer

Soundtracks

Awards and nominations 
Owen has received multiple nominations for his work in both film and television. He has one Academy Award nomination for Best Supporting Actor for his role as Larry in Closer (2004), three Golden Globe Award nominations, winning one in 2005 for Best Supporting Actor in a Motion Picture for his role in Closer; his other two nominations are for his roles in television including made-for-television film Hemingway & Gellhorn (2012) for Best Lead Actor in a Miniseries or Motion Picture Made for Television, and drama series The Knick (2014) for Best Lead Actor in a Television Series – Drama, one Primetime Emmy Award for Outstanding Lead Actor in a Limited Series or Movie nomination for his performance in Hemingway & Gellhorn (2012), and two Screen Actors Guild Award nominations – winning one in 2002 for Outstanding Performance by an Ensemble in a Motion Picture for his performance in Gosford Park (2002).

References

External links

 
 

1964 births
20th-century English male actors
21st-century English male actors
Actors from Coventry
Alumni of RADA
Best Supporting Actor BAFTA Award winners
Best Supporting Actor Golden Globe (film) winners
English male film actors
English male stage actors
English male television actors
Living people
Male actors from Warwickshire
Outstanding Performance by a Cast in a Motion Picture Screen Actors Guild Award winners